Dümbüllü is a village in the Polateli District, Kilis Province, Turkey. The village had a population of 125 in 2022.

In late 19th century, German orientalist Martin Hartmann listed the village as a settlement of 10 houses inhabited by Turks.

References

Villages in Polateli District